John D. "Jake" Carter (July 25, 1924 – April 17, 2012) was an American basketball player.  He played collegiately for East Texas State University.  He was then selected by the Baltimore Bullets in the 1948 BAA Draft.  He later played with the Denver Nuggets and Anderson Packers (1949–50) in the NBA for 24 games.

Career statistics

NBA

Source

Regular season

Playoffs

External links

References

1924 births
2012 deaths
Anderson Packers players
American men's basketball players
Baltimore Bullets (1944–1954) draft picks
Denver Nuggets (1948–1950) players
Hammond Calumet Buccaneers players
Texas A&M–Commerce Lions men's basketball players
Centers (basketball)
Power forwards (basketball)